Epicorsia is a genus of moths of the family Crambidae.

Species
Epicorsia avilalis 
Epicorsia catarinalis 
Epicorsia cerata 
Epicorsia chiapalis 
Epicorsia chicalis Munroe, 1978
Epicorsia lucialis 
Epicorsia mellinalis Hübner, 1818
Epicorsia oedipodalis (Guenée, 1854)
Epicorsia parambalis

References

Pyraustinae
Crambidae genera
Taxa named by Jacob Hübner